Holy Name of Jesus
is a Christian devotion to the name of Jesus.

Feast days 
Feast of the Holy Name of Jesus, a Christian feast day, celebrated by a number of denominations
Feast of the Holy Name of Mary, a Roman Catholic church feast day

Places of worship 
Cathedral of the Holy Name, Mumbai, the Roman Catholic cathedral in the Indian city of Mumbai (Bombay)
Holy Name of Jesus Parish (Stamford, Connecticut), a church in Stamford, Connecticut
Holy Name of Jesus Church (Stratford, Connecticut), a church in Stratford, Connecticut
Holy Name Cathedral, Brisbane, a Roman Catholic church in Queensland, Australia
Holy Name Cathedral, Chicago, the seat of the Roman Catholic Archdiocese of Chicago, Illinois, United States
The Holy Name of Jesus, Manchester, a former Jesuit church in Manchester, UK
Holy Name of Jesus Church in San Francisco
Holy Name of Jesus R.C. Church, a Roman Catholic church in New York City, New York
Santissimo Nome di Maria (disambiguation), multiple churches
Holy Name of Jesus Complex, a church in Massachusetts
Holy Name of Jesus Cathedral (disambiguation), multiple churches
Holy Name of Jesus Church (Redlands, California), a catholic church in Redlands, California.

Prayers 
Litany of the Holy Name, a Christian prayer about the name of Jesus

Religious societies

Anglican
Community of the Holy Name, a community for women with autonomous provinces in Lesotho, the United Kingdom, and South Africa
Community of the Holy Name (Australia), an Anglican religious order for women
Chita che Zita Rinoyera (Order of the Holy Name), a community for women, based at Mutare in Zimbabwe

Roman Catholic
Augustinian Province of the Most Holy Name of Jesus of the Philippines, missionaries in the Philippines.
Sisters of the Holy Names of Jesus and Mary, the teaching order founded at Longueuil, Quebec, Canada.
Society of the Holy Name, formally "Confraternity of the Most Holy Name of God and Jesus", a lay fraternity of the Dominican Order

Schools

Canada 
Holy Name of Mary College School, an independent Catholic university preparatory girls' day school in Mississauga, Ontario
Holy Name of Mary Catholic Secondary School, a regional girls' high school in Brampton, Ontario, formerly located in Mississauga
Holy Names High School (Windsor), a Catholic, coeducational high school in Windsor, Ontario

Trinidad and Tobago 
Holy Name Preparatory, a private primary school in Port of Spain, Trinidad and Tobago

United States 
Academy of the Holy Names, Albany, New York, a Catholic, college-preparatory girls' school
Academy of the Holy Names, Tampa, Florida, a Catholic co-educational elementary school and girls' high school 
Holy Name Central Catholic High School, a Catholic, coeducational high school in Worcester, Massachusetts
Holy Name High School, a Catholic, coeducational high school in Parma Heights, Ohio
Holy Name High School (Reading, PA)
Holy Name of Jesus Catholic School, a Catholic day school in Indialantic, Florida
Holy Name School, a Catholic grade school in Birmingham, Michigan
Holy Names Academy, a Catholic girls' high school in Seattle, Washington
Holy Names High School (Oakland), a Catholic girls' school in Oakland, California
Holy Names University, a coeducational Catholic university in Oakland, California
Holy Name of Jesus Catholic School, a Catholic private day school
Province of the Most Holy Name of Jesus (Western), a province of the Dominican order

Other uses 
Pierce v. Society of Sisters of the Holy Names of Jesus and Mary, an important early 20th century United States Supreme Court decision

See also 
Church of the Holy Name of Jesus (disambiguation)
Jesus (name), a given name
Names and titles of Jesus in the New Testament 
Names of God
Nomina sacra, the abbreviation of several divine names